Figght is an Indian Marathi-language action-romance film. It was directed by Jimmy Moray, edited by Shashank Shah, written by Swapnil Mahaling and produced by Lalit Oswaal under the banner of Future X Production. The film stars Jeet More while featuring Suresh Vishwakarma, Purva Shinde, Anup Ingale and Madhav Abhyankar. The film was released in India on 11 January 2019.

Plot  

A young boy has an altercation with his father which results in the boy leaving the village of Satara, India. He encounters several members of a gang and a fight ensues, in which he impresses the gang's boss and is admitted into the gang. The boy is convinced to sell drugs, under the impression that he is selling Ayurvedic medicine (i.e.: traditional Hindu medicine). A boxing coach catches the attention of the young boy and attempts to train him to become a boxing champion.

Cast 

 Jeet More
 Suresh Vishwakarma
Purva Shinde
Anup Ingale
Madhav Abhyankar
 Nishigandha Kunte
 Sayali Joshi
 Prasad Surve

Music 
The film's soundtrack was composed and produced by Swapnil Godbole with lyrics by Mandar Cholkar. The first song, "Kalana Kahi", was sung by Ajay Gogavale and released by Everest Marathi on 18 December 2018. The song "Bukkebaaz", a Marathi rap composed and written by Ray Marshall, J-Subodh and Mc Azad, was released on 2 January 2019.

Controversies 

Followers of Udyanraje Bhosale objected to the use of the dialogue "साताऱ्यात माझंच चालतं" (I rule Satara) in the movie. The dialogue went viral and was featured on prominent news channels across Maharashtra. The vehicles of "Figght" crew members were damaged while on a promotional tour across Satara  and posters were torn by protesters. Three protesters who were responsible for damaging vehicles and public property were arrested by the Satara Police. As the protest grew, the crew and director had to intervene. Jimmy Moray, director of Figght, stated that the movie is not against Udyanraje Bhosale and that the dialogue is an integral part of the story.

References

External links 

 

2019 films
Indian drama films
2010s Marathi-language films
2019 drama films